Tariq Yunus (16 October 1946 – 26 August 1994) was an Indian actor known for his role as chef Alaudin in television sitcom Tandoori Nights.

Biography 

As a young man (his brother being the politician Kunwar Khalid Yunus), Yunus gained his first acting part in a children's play for local radio and began to work regularly for this media. He joined a theatrical group run by the Arts Council while at college studying Geology.

Two months before he was due to take his Geology Degree exams in 1962, Yunus headed to Britain in the hope of making his fortune. Arriving with only £10 in his pocket, he had to get a job helping a milkman. Living on his wits, he became a professional card player.

Without any proper training, Yunus began to work as an extra which lead to having parts in The Wednesday Play, Crown Court, Sykes, Father Brown, It Ain't Half Hot Mum, Angels, the Doctor Who classic The Robots of Death, The Professionals, Strangers, Terry and June, The Dick Emery Show, Hammer House of Horror, Shoestring, Minder, The Bill, Around the World in 80 Days, Inspector Morse and House of Cards. Along the way, he achieved bigger and more regular roles such as playing a con-man in A Passage to India (for Play for Today), Jashir Singh Mahail in Birmingham-based drama series Gangsters, Dr. Khan in We'll Think of Something and Harry Patel in News at Twelve.

Film roles included East of Elephant Rock, Rosie Dixon – Night Nurse, The Golden Lady, Ashanti, Who Dares Wins, A Talent for Murder, The Fourth Protocol, Partition, The Deceivers and Scandal.

The 1988 Screen Two play Lucky Sunil was inspired by Tariq's tales when he first came to London, with the actor co-starring in the production.

Later in life, Yunus concentrated more on writing and developing his own projects, which lead him back to his native India but still continued to act. For many years, he was a founder member of Equity's Afro-Asian Committee, promoting the careers of actors from other ethnic minorities.

Death

While directing a play at Bombay's Prithvi Theatre in 1994, Yunus died from a heart attack whilst suffering with typhoid in the house of his friend Jalal Agha, the son of Bollywood actor Agha. (However, his obituary claims he died in hospital.) He is buried in Karachi.

Filmography

Notes

References

External links

1946 births
1994 deaths
Indian male television actors
Indian male film actors
20th-century Indian male actors